Thorndale is a city in Milam County, Texas, with a small part in Williamson County. The population was 1,263 at the 2020 census. It was founded in 1878 about 3 miles west of its present site, and moved to its current site in 1880.

History
Antonio Gómez, a Mexican-American teenager, was lynched on June 19, 1911, in Thorndale following his lethal stabbing of a German-American garage owner, Charles Zieschang. Concerns about prejudice and violence against Mexican-American youths, such as the Gómez hanging, inspired Jovita Idar to found the League of Mexican Women (La Liga Femenil Mexicanista).

Geography

Thorndale is located at  (30.612549, –97.204523), about 40 miles northeast of Austin and 12 miles west of Rockdale.  Most of the city lies in Milam County, with only a small portion in Williamson County.

According to the United States Census Bureau, the city has a total area of 1.0 square miles (2.5 km2), all land.

Climate

The climate in this area is characterized by hot, humid summers and generally mild to cool winters.  According to the Köppen Climate Classification system, Thorndale has a humid subtropical climate, abbreviated "Cfa" on climate maps.

Demographics

As of the 2020 United States census, there were 1,263 people, 588 households, and 348 families residing in the city.

As of the census of 2000, there were 1,278 people, 485 households, and 354 families residing in the city. The population density was 1,307.2 people per square mile (503.5/km2). There were 542 housing units at an average density of 554.4/sq mi (213.5/km2). The racial makeup of the city was 83.26% White, 6.81% African American, 0.78% Native American, 0.16% Asian, 6.18% from other races, and 2.82% from two or more races. Hispanic or Latino of any race were 17.14% of the population.

There were 485 households, out of which 36.1% had children under the age of 18 living with them, 54.6% were married couples living together, 12.6% had a female householder with no husband present, and 27.0% were non-families. 24.5% of all households were made up of individuals, and 13.8% had someone living alone who was 65 years of age or older. The average household size was 2.64 and the average family size was 3.10.

In the city, the population was spread out, with 29.7% under the age of 18, 7.8% from 18 to 24, 27.2% from 25 to 44, 20.7% from 45 to 64, and 14.5% who were 65 years of age or older. The median age was 35 years. For every 100 females, there were 97.8 males. For every 100 females age 18 and over, there were 85.9 males.

The median income for a household in the city was $33,684, and the median income for a family was $40,625. Males had a median income of $33,125 versus $21,786 for females. The per capita income for the city was $18,722. About 4.5% of families and 9.3% of the population were below the poverty line, including 8.9% of those under age 18 and 21.0% of those age 65 or over.

Education
The City of Thorndale is served by the Thorndale Independent School District.

Religion

Thorndale has a number of churches, representing several denominations. Pleasant Retreat United Methodist Church (Texas Annual Conference), St. Paul Lutheran Church (Missouri Synod), St. John Lutheran Church (ELCA), First Baptist Church of Thorndale (FBC), Shiloh Baptist Church (SBC) and Mount Zion Baptist Church (National Baptist) are the main congregations serving Thorndale.

"The Rookie"

Thorndale (along with Thrall, Taylor, and Round Rock to the west) was where the vast majority of the principal photography and locations for the 2002 movie The Rookie, starring Dennis Quaid, and Rachel Griffiths, were filmed. The Thorndale High School baseball stadium, the downtown main street, and other parts of town were integral to the film, with Thorndale cast as "Big Lake, Texas". Local resident Emanuel “Shifty” Castillo's role in the film was to throw the baseball when Dennis Quaid was on the mound. Other local residents also appeared in the film as extras. Thorndale has also served as location for a number of other films and other productions.

The Apache Pass Amphitheater
The Apache Pass Amphitheater and Festival Grounds is located about 7 miles north of Thorndale on FM 908, just off FM 486. Apache Pass hosts a number of major events each year., including Christian music festivals and the eastern edition of the Nocturnal Wonderland (formerly known as the Nocturnal Fest), one of the largest electronic music festivals in the United States which found 50,000 musical enthusiasts attending in 2012. Apache Pass also hosts the Annual Texas Trail Riders Convention and Trail Ride and the Annual Silver Spurs Spring Jam, which benefits the SS BEVO Endowment, which has been established to fund the care and expenses of BEVO (the UT Longhorn steer mascot), provides scholarships for UT students and supports the University of Texas Neighborhood Longhorns program. Apache Pass also hosts a number of local events and concerts, and has become a vital part of the Thorndale community and its tradition of the arts, music and film. Apache Pass also has a historical museum dedicated to the Apache nation and the contribution of Native Americans in the history of Texas.

Notable people

 Lee Roy Caffey, Former All-Pro NFL linebacker who played on the legendary Green Bay Packers teams of the 1960s, was born in nearby Rockdale but attended and played football at Thorndale High School
 Sam Smith, World War II combat photographer, painter, and multimedia artist, was born in Thorndale in 1918

References

External links
 

Cities in Milam County, Texas
Cities in Williamson County, Texas
Greater Austin
Cities in Texas